Trinidad Cardona (born May 23, 1999) is an American singer, songwriter, and social media personality from Phoenix, Arizona. He is of mixed Mexican and African-American ancestry. 

Some of his most famous songs include:
 "Dinero"
 "Hayya Hayya (Better Together)", with Davido and AISHA (the first single of the multi-song FIFA World Cup Qatar 2022™ Official Soundtrack)
 "Love Me Back"

He also featured here:
 "Does It Feel Like Falling" by Alex Aiono

References

External links 
 
 

1999 births
Living people
American people of Mexican descent
21st-century African-American male singers
People from Phoenix, Arizona
American rhythm and blues singers
American songwriters